WANS (1280 AM) is a southern gospel radio station located in Anderson, South Carolina, United States. The station is licensed by the FCC to broadcast with 5 kW. during the daytime and 1 kW. directional at night.

Station history
WANS 1280 AM has been in existence since June 1, 1949.  For many years, it was a top 40 station.  In the 1960s the call letters stood for "We're Anderson's Now Sound".  Later..."We're Anderson's New Sound".

WANS was paired up with 100,000-watt WANS-FM 107.3 (now WJMZ-FM) in the 1960s.  Both stations had separate feeds and broadcast from studios located on Clemson Blvd. in Anderson. The two stations were wildly popular for many years. A large WANS-AM/FM sign was erected in front of the studios on Clemson Blvd. and advertised local Anderson stores and community events. In 1988, news studios were built beside the existing ones. After new ownership took over in 1990, declining ratings and loss of key staff caused a steep decline in ratings for both the AM and FM stations.  In 1992, the stations went bankrupt. WANS-FM 107 was moved to Greenville, South Carolina. The WANS studios on Clemson Blvd. were sold. From 1992 to late 1993, WANS 1280 was operated from the transmitter site nearby. The station began simulcasting WFBC 1330's News/Talk feed out of Greenville, South Carolina.

In late 1993, WRIX-AM-FM owner Matt Phillips purchased WANS and moved all operations back to Anderson. WANS-FM 107 soon changed call letters to WJMZ-FM. WANS 1280 aired The Matt and Bev Show from WRIX. WANS then played a mix of oldies music and standards for several years with live and local DJs such as Jerry Peeler's beach show & Jimmy Gilstrap's classic 60's & 70's rock-n-roll which was live every Saturday. In early 2000, the station became all Carolina Beach Oldies headed by longtime WANS DJ and manager Dann Scott. In 2005, the station went all Sports Talk from ESPN. Over the years it would also play other style talk shows.  In 2013, it went to all Sports Talk again from Fox Sports. In November 2014, WANS flipped to a Classic Hits format and was simulcasted with WRIX-FM 103.1. Owner Tom Ervin donated WRIX-AM-FM and WANS to the Power Foundation out of Greenville, South Carolina that operates Southern Gospel Radio stations in other markets. In late February 2015, WANS was flipped to 1950s-1970s Oldies. It was then paired with an FM translator 107.7 FM. This put WANS back on FM for the first time since 1992. On March 1, 2015, the simulcast with WHQA (formerly WRIX-FM) 103.1 ended. WHQA flipped to a Southern gospel format, and WANS 1280 and 107.7 FM flipped to classic hits.

Today, WANS is the sister station to WRIX & WHQA. In September 2008, the format was shifted from ESPN Sports/Talk to News/Talk, the former format and lineup of sister station WRIX-FM/103.1, which shifted to Adult Contemporary on the same day. WANS still broadcasts the ESPN Radio Network late at night and on weekends.

WANS carried all Anderson Joes Baseball games live until the league went under. They broadcast many different sports from Anderson University and football games from Coastal Carolina University. They also air all of the Westside High School Ram football games.

On January 25, 2013 WANS changed their format from news/talk to sports, with programming from Fox Sports Radio. Tom Ervin purchased WANS in 2013.

WANS celebrated 65 years on the air on June 1, 2014 with a radio special hosted by upstate radio veteran "Jazzy" Jeff Bright, host of The Greatest Hits on sister station WRIX-FM 103.1.

On November 29, 2014 WANS changed their format from sports to classic hits, simulcasting WRIX-FM 103.1 Honea Path, South Carolina. The flip to 1950s-1970s Oldies and end of having the same feed as WHQA (formerly WRIX-FM) began on March 1, 2015.  WANS is also back on FM with a translator. Now at 107.7 FM, WANS is on FM for the first time since 1992.

Om December 1, 2016 WANS changed their format to southern gospel, branded as "God's Country".

Former on-air staff
 Charlie McCoy
 Jay Clark (Deceased)
 Scott Shannon
 Jim "Grum" Graham
 Ed Lively
 Dann "The Scooter" Scott
 Willis H. Crosby
 Bill Catcher
 Mike Benson
 Joe (Jeff) Hayes
 Dallas Kincade
 Pistol Pete (deceased)
 Joe Robinson (Hollywood Joe)
Chris Scott
Bill McCown
Scooter Leslie
Ron Lee
Ken Allison
Jimmy Gilstrap
Jerry Peeler
Frank Allison
Kip Anderson

References

External links

 https://www.facebook.com/Beachmusicshow?hc_location=timeline

ANS
1949 establishments in South Carolina